Bandwaya is a village located in the Tel Keppe District of Ninawa Province, Kurdistan Region Iraq.

Etymology 
The village's name is a Syriac contraction of "Bet Handwaya" meaning "house [land of] the Indian."

History
The first mention of Bandwaya occurred in a 12th-century manuscript written by a priest named Ishaq from the town of Baa'shika, in which a blind man from "Behendwaya village" was recorded. Assyrians from Alqosh were known to have settled in Bandwaya. Later on, Assyrian refugees arrived in the village from Turkey to supplement the local Assyrian population. The village existed as such up until being occupied by Arabs in the 1970s.

See also
List of Assyrian settlements

Sources 

Assyrian communities in Iraq
Populated places in Nineveh Governorate